Minister for Local Government, Territories and Roads was a position within the Australian federal government from 7 October 2003 until 3 December 2007.

The outer ministry position of Minister for Local Government, Territories and Roads was created in the Third Howard Ministry on 7 October 2003. The first minister to hold this position was Senator Ian Campbell, who held it from 7 October 2003 until 18 July 2004.  On 18 July 2004, the position was transferred to Jim Lloyd, then Federal Member for Robertson. When the Fourth Howard Ministry started on 22 October 2004, Lloyd retained the position, and did so until the 2007 Federal Election when Kevin Rudd and the Australian Labor Party won government.

Rudd's first ministry eliminated the position of Minister for Local Government, Territories and Roads. The responsibilities were given to Anthony Albanese, Minister for Infrastructure, Transport, Regional Development and Local Government. Accordingly, the old Department of Transport and Regional Services was renamed to Department of Infrastructure, Transport, Regional Development and Local Government.

Ministers for local government

External links
 Department of Infrastructure, Transport, Regional Development and Local Government

Local Government, Territories and Roads